In human sexuality, a sex life is a sector of a person's day-to-day existence which may involve sexual activity or represent the absence of sexual activity. In general parlance, the term can have many sub-meanings and social layers, but generally includes the following:

 The individual is able to, on an either regular or semi-regular basis, enter into voluntarily agreed and consensual situations involving partnered sexual activity, i.e. an activity other than solo masturbation. This would inherently mean there is at least one other person per situation, with or without sexual activity, and regardless of whether or not these situations are sexually monogamous; i.e., a "sex life" can be had just as easily with a long-term sexual partner as it can with multiple partners in rapid succession over a lifetime. The idea of a 'regularly or semi-regularly' sex life varies, but categorizing an individual who is involuntarily celibate (as opposed to voluntary abstinence) as having a sex life may be inaccurate.
 Presuming the above is true by default, the individual who has a sex life is then able to explore and deepen their existing sexual skills and also, when they desire it, is able to have the opportunity to learn new ones and to "grow" as a sexual being.
 The individual is able, because of these factors, to have an "area" of their overall "life" that involves sex in a way that is somewhat similar to how athletes have an "area" of their lives that involves sports or how musicians have an "area" of their lives that involves music. A person with a secure and constantly developing sex life is inherently able to regard their sexuality as an active part of themselves, and although a secure sex life does not necessarily mean that the person will always feel self-confident or sexually attractive, consistent access to sex and the ability to deepen and broaden one's sexual skills provides a certain psychological assurance of sex appeal that people who do not have a "sex life" tend not to have.

Sex frequency
Several sources say that in humans, frequency of sexual intercourse might range from 0 to 20 times a week. In the United States, the average frequency of sexual intercourse for married couples is 2 to 3 times a week. It is generally recognized that postmenopausal women experience declines in frequency of sexual intercourse and that average frequency of intercourse declines with age. According to the Kinsey Institute, average frequency of sexual intercourse in US is 112 times per year (age 18–29), 86 times per year (age 30–39), and 69 times per year (age 40–49).

In a number of sexual harassment cases, certain employees and others have been asked about their sex lives, often repeatedly, including in a case filed against Mitsubishi Motor Manufacturing of America by the Equal Employment Opportunity Commission (EEOC).

See also
Louise Porton – woman who murdered her two children in 2018 as they "got in the way" of her sex life

References

Human sexuality
Personal life